Margaret Burton may refer to:

 Margaret Burton (actress), English actress
 Margaret E. Burton, American missionary in China and Japan
 Margaret Burton (Madlax), fictional character from the anime series, Madlax
 Maggie Burton, fictional character from the TV series, In the Flesh